Shyroka Balka is a village in Odesa Raion (district) in Odesa Oblast of southern Ukraine. It belongs to Biliaivka urban hromada, one of the hromadas of Ukraine. 

Until 18 July 2020, Shyroka Balka belonged to Biliaivka Raion. The raion was abolished in July 2020 as part of the administrative reform of Ukraine, which reduced the number of raions of Odesa Oblast to seven. The area of Biliaivka Raion was merged into Odesa Raion.

References

External links

Villages in Odesa Raion